Rhopalocarpus louvelii is a tree in the family Sphaerosepalaceae. It is endemic to Madagascar.

Distribution and habitat
Rhopalocarpus louvelii is a widespread species in Madagascar. Its habitat is both dry and wet forests from sea-level to  altitude. Some populations are within protected areas.

Threats
Rhopalocarpus louvelii is threatened by shifting patterns of agriculture, resulting in deforestation. Because the species is used as timber, subsistence harvesting is also a threat.

References

louvelii
Endemic flora of Madagascar
Trees of Madagascar
Plants described in 1925